Koppen is a surname. Notable people with the surname include:

 Dan Koppen (born 1979), American football offensive lineman
 Erwin Koppen (1929–1990), German literary scholar
 Luise Koppen (1855–1922), German author
 Wladimir Köppen (1846–1940), climatologist
 Köppen climate classification, developed by Wladimir Köppen
 Otto C. Koppen (1901–1991), American aircraft engineer

See also
 Koeppen, surname
 Köppen, surname
 Lene Køppen (born 1953), Danish badminton player